Nadine Paula Ann Baylis (15 June 1940 – 3 November 2017) was a British stage and costume designer, who "set the standard for modern dance costume".

Early life
Nadine Baylis was born in London, the daughter of Alice (nee Down) and Sydney Baylis, who ran  a car hire business, and then a pub in Shepherd's Bush, west London. She went to Lady Margaret School, in Parsons Green. Baylis was educated at London's Central School of Art and Design.

Career
Early in her career, Baylis worked with Ralph Koltai. Baylis was closely associated with Ballet Rambert, and first worked with them in 1965, and  the ballets of Glen Tetley.

Later life
Baylis died on 3 November 2017, and lived at Scotsgrove, Thame, Buckinghamshire.

Selected productions (as designer)
Ziggurat (Ballet Rambert, 1967)
Embrace Tiger and Return to Mountain (Ballet Rambert, 1968)
Field Figures (Royal Ballet, 1970)
Sacre du printemps (Munich State Opera, 1974)
The Tempest (Ballet Rambert, 1979)
Alice (National Ballet of Canada, 1986)
Orpheus (Australian Ballet, 1987)
Oracle (National Ballet of Canada, 1994)
Michael Corder's Romeo and Juliet (1992) for the Norwegian National Ballet
London Contemporary Dance Theatre's The Phantasmagoria in 1987
Ben Stevenson's Alice in Wonderland (1992) for Houston Ballet

References

1940 births
2017 deaths
British costume designers
Alumni of the Central School of Art and Design
People educated at Lady Margaret School